Harmogenanina detecta is a species of air-breathing land snails or semislugs, terrestrial pulmonate gastropod mollusks in the family Helicarionidae.

This species is endemic to Réunion.

References

Endemic fauna of Réunion
Molluscs of Réunion
Harmogenanina
Gastropods described in 1827
Taxonomy articles created by Polbot